Carmine is a city in Fayette County, Texas, United States. The population was 250 at the 2010 census.

The Texas Basketball Museum in Carmine is operated by Coach Bob Springer at the corner of Augsburg Avenue and Hauptstrasse Street. The collection highlights players who advance to the professional ranks as well as high school teams of notable achievement.

Geography
Carmine is located at the northern end of Fayette County at  (30.149059, −96.688420). It is bordered to the northeast by Washington County. U.S. Route 290, a four-lane divided highway, passes through the center of Carmine, leading east  to Brenham and west  to Giddings.

Climate

Demographics

As of the census of 2000, there were 228 people, 91 households, and 60 families residing in the city. The population density was 138.4 people per square mile (53.4/km2). There were 118 housing units at an average density of 71.6 per square mile (27.6/km2). The racial makeup of the city was 90.35% White, 1.75% African American, 0.44% Native American, 6.14% from other races, and 1.32% from two or more races. Hispanic or Latino of any race were 11.40% of the population.

There were 91 households, out of which 26.4% had children under the age of 18 living with them, 62.6% were married couples living together, 4.4% had a female householder with no husband present, and 33.0% were non-families. 31.9% of all households were made up of individuals, and 20.9% had someone living alone who was 65 years of age or older. The average household size was 2.40 and the average family size was 3.07.

In the city, the population was spread out, with 23.2% under the age of 18, 7.9% from 18 to 24, 22.4% from 25 to 44, 24.6% from 45 to 64, and 21.9% who were 65 years of age or older. The median age was 43 years. For every 100 females, there were 78.1 males. For every 100 females age 18 and over, there were 80.4 males.

The median income for a household in the city was $27,396, and the median income for a family was $49,375. Males had a median income of $30,625 versus $29,063 for females. The per capita income for the city was $34,614. About 15.1% of families and 14.7% of the population were below the poverty line, including 16.7% of those under the age of eighteen and 18.9% of those 65 or over.

Education
Carmine is served by the Round Top-Carmine Independent School District.

References

External links

 Carmine Chamber of Commerce

Cities in Texas
Cities in Fayette County, Texas